Agnes of Durazzo (1345 – 10 February 1383) was the wife of James of Baux, titular Latin Emperor of Constantinople. She was the last woman to claim the title of empress of the Latin Empire.

Agnes was the second daughter of Charles, Duke of Durazzo and Maria of Calabria. She first married Cansignorio della Scala. Cansignorio was a younger brother and nominal co-ruler  of Cangrande II della Scala, Lord of Verona. In 1359, Cansignorio assassinated his older brother and succeeded him. His younger brother Paolo Alboino della Scala became his co-ruler until 1365. On 10 October 1375, Cansignorio died, presumed to have been poisoned. Their marriage was childless.

On 16 September 1382, Agnes married by proxy to her second husband, James of Baux. He was the claimant to the throne of the Latin Empire since 1374. Her brother-in-law, Charles III of Naples, granted her Corfu as part of her dowry. Their marriage was short-lived. Agnes died 10 February 1383. James died in Taranto on 7 July 1383.

References

Sources

External links

1345 births
1383 deaths
House of Anjou-Durazzo
Scaliger family
Latin Empresses of Constantinople
Princesses of Taranto
Princesses of Achaea
14th-century women